Making the Grade is a 1929 American Pre-Code comedy film directed by Alfred E. Green and starring Lois Moran, Edmund Lowe and Lucien Littlefield.

Cast
 Lois Moran as Lettie Ewing  
 Edmund Lowe as Herbert Littell Dodsworth  
 Lucien Littlefield as Silas Cooper 
 James Ford as Bud Davison  
 Rolfe Sedan as Valet  
 John Alden as Egbert Williamson 
 Sherman Ross as Arthur Burdette  
 Gino Conti as Frank Dinwiddie  
 Lia Torá as Another Girl Friend

References

Bibliography
 Solomon, Aubrey. The Fox Film Corporation, 1915-1935: A History and Filmography. McFarland, 2011.

External links

1929 films
American comedy films
American black-and-white films
1929 comedy films
1920s English-language films
Films directed by Alfred E. Green
Fox Film films
1920s American films